The Santa Rosa River (Portuguese, Rio Santa Rosa) is a river of Rio Grande do Sul state in southern Brazil. It is a tributary of the Uruguay River.

See also
List of rivers of Rio Grande do Sul

References

Brazilian Ministry of Transport

Rivers of Rio Grande do Sul
Santa Rosa, Rio Grande do Sul